Olivia Rogowska was the defending champion, but lost in the quarterfinals to Misa Eguchi.
Eguchi went on to win the tournament, defeating Elizaveta Kulichkova in the final, 4–6, 6–2, 6–3.

Seeds

Main draw

Finals

Top half

Bottom half

References 
 Main draw

McDonald's Burnie International - Women's Singles
2014 Women's Singles
McDonald's Burnie International - Women's Singles